Paul C. Morrissey is an American comedian, who was born in Owego, New York.

Morrissey attended Binghamton University, where he played college basketball as a point guard.  After a brief stint as a television sports anchor, Morrissey began performing at comedy clubs across the United States and in Canada.

He has appeared on The Late Late Show with Craig Ferguson four times in a total of 16 months.

References

Year of birth missing (living people)
Living people
American stand-up comedians
Basketball players from New York (state)
Binghamton Bearcats men's basketball players
People from Owego, New York
Point guards
Comedians from New York (state)
American men's basketball players